The Ven. Gerald Robert Phizackerley (born 3 October 1929) was Archdeacon of Chesterfield from 1978  until 1996.

Biography
He was educated at Queen Elizabeth Grammar School, Penrith, University College, Oxford and Wells Theological College and ordained in 1955. After a curacy at St Barnabas, Carlisle he was Chaplain of Abingdon School from 1957 to 1963. He was Rector  of Gaywood from 1964 to 1978; and Rural Dean of  Lynn from 1968 to 1978 before his time as Archdeacon and Priest in charge of Ashford-in-the-Water afterwards.

Notes

Archdeacons of Chesterfield
People educated at Queen Elizabeth Grammar School, Penrith
Alumni of University College, Oxford
Alumni of Wells Theological College
Staff of Abingdon School
1929 births
Living people
People from King's Lynn